Diploprion is a genus  of marine ray-finned fish, related to the groupers and included in the subfamily Epinephelinae, part of the family Serranidae, which also includes the anthias and sea basses. They are found in the Indo-Pacific region.

Species
There are two species within the genus Diploprion:

 Diploprion bifasciatum Cuvier, 1828 (Barred soapfish)
 Diploprion drachi Roux-Estève, 1955 (Yellowfin soapfish)

References

Diploprionini
Ray-finned fish genera
Taxa named by Georges Cuvier